The siege of Tortosa (16 December 1810 – 2 January 1811) pitted an Imperial French army under General Louis Gabriel Suchet against the Spanish defenders of Tortosa led by General Lilli, Conde de Alacha.

Background
The French conquest of Aragon started with the siege of Tortosa.

Siege
The siege progressed swiftly and Alacha surrendered on 2 January 1811. The action took place during the Peninsular War, part of the Napoleonic Wars.

Colonel Rouelle was employed at the siege of Tortosa, where he defeated two sorties by the besieged on the December 24  and December 28, 1810. These two feats were mentioned in dispatches.

Aftermath
The French conquest of Aragon proceeded with the Battle of El Pla.

Notes

References
 
 

Sieges of the Peninsular War
Sieges of the Napoleonic Wars
Battles in Catalonia
Sieges involving Spain
Sieges involving France
Sieges involving Poland
Sieges involving Italy
1810 in Spain
1811 in Spain
Conflicts in 1810
Conflicts in 1811
December 1810 events
January 1811 events
Battles inscribed on the Arc de Triomphe